Contramaestre (Spanish for "boatswain") is a Cuban town and municipality in the Santiago de Cuba Province.

Geography
The municipality is located in the western part of the province, neighboring the provinces of Granma and Holguín; and borders with the municipalities of Jiguaní, Urbano Noris, Palma Soriano and Tercer Frente.

It includes the villages of Altos de Ventas, Anacahuita, America Libre, Baire, El Naranjo, Guaninao, La Maritonia, Laguna Blanca, Los Negros, Los Pasos, Maffo, Palo Seco, Pino de Baire, Pueblo Nuevo and Xavier.

Demographics
In 2004, municipal population of Contramaestre was of 101,832, of which 44,752 in the town. Contramaestre is known as the land of citric.

Infrastructure
Main Hospital: Orlando Pantoja Tamayo (22.July.1988)
Elementary Schools: Jose de la Luz y Caballero. Semi-internado: Orlando Pantoja T.
Secondary Schools: Pepito Tey. Rodolfo Rodríguez
Public Library: Luz Berta Sánchez.

See also
Municipalities of Cuba
List of cities in Cuba

References

External links

Cities in Cuba
Populated places in Santiago de Cuba Province